Arthur Gregory Slade (born July 9, 1967 in Moose Jaw, Saskatchewan) is a Canadian author.  A resident of Saskatoon, he was raised on a ranch in the Cypress Hills and began writing in high school. He attended the University of Saskatchewan in Saskatoon and received an English Honours degree in 1989. His first short story was published that same year. He then worked as a night auditor at a hotel for several months and as a copywriter for a radio station in Saskatoon for several years.

Slade became a full-time writer after the publication of his first novel for middle years, Draugr, followed by others such as Dust and Tribes. His novel Dust received the Governor General's Award for Children's Literature in 2001, and The Hunchback Assignments won the TD Canadian Children's Literature Award in 2010.

List of published works

The Northern Frights series
Draugr (1997)
The Haunting of Drang Island (1998)
The Loki Wolf (2000)

The Canadian Chills series
Return of the Grudstone Ghosts (2002)
Ghost Hotel (2004)
Invasion of the IQ Snatchers (2007)

The Hunchback Assignments series
The Hunchback Assignments (2009)
The Dark Deeps (2010)
Empire of Ruins (2011)
Island of Doom (July 2012)

Biographies
John Diefenbaker: an Appointment with Destiny (2000)

Stand-alone books
Dust (2001)
Tribes (2002)
Monsterology (2005)
Megiddo's Shadow (2006)
Jolted (2008)

Comics
Hallowed Knight (1997) issues #1–3.

References

External links
Arthur Slade's website
HarperCollins Canada site
Video trailer for Meggido's Shadow

Visual Bibliography at BookReviewsAndMore.ca
Arthur Slade interview at BookReviewsAndMore.ca

Canadian children's writers
Canadian fantasy writers
Canadian biographers
Canadian male non-fiction writers
Male biographers
1967 births
Living people
Writers from Saskatchewan
People from Moose Jaw
Governor General's Award-winning children's writers